The Roman Catholic Diocese of Balsas is a diocese located in the city of Balsas in the Ecclesiastical province of São Luís do Maranhão in Brazil.

History
 20 December 1954: Established as Territorial Prelature of Santo Antônio de Balsas from the Diocese of Caxias do Maranhão
 26 October 1981: Promoted as Diocese of Balsas

Bishops
Prelates of Santo Antônio de Balsas
Diego Parodi, M.C.C.I. (1959.05.09 – 1966)
Rino Carlesi, M.C.C.I. (1967.01.12 1981.10.25)
Bishops of Balsas
 Rino Carlesi, M.C.C.I. (1981.10.25 – 1998.04.15)
 Gianfranco Masserdotti, M.C.C.I. (1998.04.15 – 2006.09.17)
 Coadjutor bishop 1995–1998
 Enemésio Ângelo Lazzaris, F.D.P. (2007.12.12 – 2020.02.02)
 Valentim Fagundes de Meneses, M.S.C. (2020.07.29 – present) 

Other priest of this diocese who became bishop
Sebastião Bandeira Coêlho, appointed Auxiliary Bishop of Manaus, Amazonas in 2004

References

External links
 GCatholic.org
 Catholic Hierarchy

Roman Catholic dioceses in Brazil
Christian organizations established in 1954
Balsas, Roman Catholic Diocese of
Roman Catholic dioceses and prelatures established in the 20th century